Rossjoycea glacialis is a species of beetle in the family Carabidae, the only species in the genus Rossjoycea.

References

Psydrinae